Catie Cuan an artist and innovator in the field of choreorobotics. She is a robotics Ph.D. candidate at Stanford University in the Department of Mechanical Engineering.

Early life and education 

She earned a bachelor’s degree from the University of California, Berkeley. As a ballet dancer and choreographer, she has performed with the Metropolitan Opera Ballet and the Lyric Opera of Chicago.

Career 
Cuan credits her work in robotics to the experience after her father had experienced a stroke, and was surrounded by medical machines, and how people might, "feel empowered and hopeful rather than afraid."

In 2020, she was the dancer and choreographer of the show, “Output,” which was part of a collaboration with ThoughtWorks Arts and the Pratt Institute. In the production, she danced with an ABB IRB 6700 industrial robot.

In 2022, she was named as an IF/THEN ambassador for the American Association for the Advancement of Science. She was the Futurist-in-Residence at the Smithsonian Arts and Industries Building and performed at the closing ceremonies of the FUTURES exhibit on July 6, 2022.

Cuan has also contributed to product designs, working with IDEO and Dutch interior design firm moooi on their Piro project  which is dancing scent diffuser robot launched for Milan Design Week in June 2022.

References

External links 
 
 
 

American choreographers
Robotics
American roboticists
University of California, Berkeley alumni
Living people
Year of birth missing (living people)